The dwarf stonebasher (Pollimyrus castelnaui) is a large and weakly electric elephantfish attaining an average length of 2 centimetres. This species inhabits landlocked freshwater habitats spread across Angola, Namibia, and Botswana. It is occasionally found in the aquarium trade, being referred to as the “baby whale fish”, however it is difficult to maintain due to all specimens being wild caught.

References

Mormyridae
Fish described in 1911
Taxa named by George Albert Boulenger
Fish of Angola
Fish of Botswana
Fish of Namibia